Vasilios Vogiatzis (born 10 January 1996) is a Greek professional footballer who plays as a defensive midfielder for Super League 2 club Kallithea.

References

1996 births
Living people
Football League (Greece) players
Gamma Ethniki players
Ergotelis F.C. players
O.F. Ierapetra F.C. players
Association football midfielders
Footballers from Heraklion
Greek footballers